Tatsuya Yamaguchi may refer to:

 Tatsuya Yamaguchi (motorcyclist) (born 1976), Japanese  motorcycle racer
 Tatsuya Yamaguchi (actor) (born 1972), Japanese film and television actor
 Tatsuya Yamaguchi (footballer) (born 2000), Japanese footballer